Owo Museum is a museum in Owo, Nigeria. The museum was founded in 1968 to accommodate the antiquities which were formerly in the Olowo Palace. The museum contains significant archaeological artifacts and ethnographic materials discovered in the Owo area.

The Owo site was first excavated in 1969-1971 by Ekpo Eyo under the auspices of the Department of Antiquities of the Government of Nigeria. Due to Owo's location between the two famous art centers of Ife and Benin, the site reflects both artistic traditions. Important discoveries include terracotta sculptures dating from the 15th century.

References

Museums in Nigeria
Museums established in 1968
Owo
20th-century architecture in Nigeria